Derna Casetti (born 11 March 1959) is a former Italian female middle-distance and cross-country runner who competed at individual senior level at the World Athletics Cross Country Championships (1977).

References

External links
 

1959 births
Living people
Italian female middle-distance runners
Italian female cross country runners